Gidudu is a surname. Notable people with the surname include:

 Patrick Gidudu, Anglican bishop in Uganda
 Samuel Gidudu (born 1968), Anglican bishop in Uganda

Surnames of African origin